The Girl Scouts of Taiwan is the national Guiding organization of Taiwan (Republic of China). Girl Scouting was introduced to China in 1919; the association became a member of the World Association of Girl Guides and Girl Scouts in 1963.

The group changed its name from National Girl Scouts Association of the Republic of China to the National Girl Scouts Association of Taiwan in 1999. In 2002, the association opened the Girl Scout Center in Taipei and in 2006, and the organization was renamed the Girl Scouts of Taiwan.

As of 2003, the girls-only organization has 28,105 members.

Programme and ideals
The programme is based on the fundamentals of WAGGGS along with the five Chinese educational themes: moral, physical, intellectual, group and beauty. It focuses on self-training (mentally and physically) to achieve full potential and become responsible citizens in the future.

Emblem
The Girl Scout emblem features the Blue Sky with a White Sun.

Guide Promise
Traditional Chinese
 憑我的真誠，我願對上蒼和我的國家，
 盡我的本分，我願隨時幫助他人，
 我願意遵守女童軍規律。
Translation
 On my honor,
 I promise that I will do my best:
 To do my duty to God and My country;
 To help other people at all times;
 To obey the Girl Scout Law.

Guide Law

Guide Motto
Traditional Chinese
準備。
日行一善。
人生以服務為目的。
Translation
Be Prepared
Do a good turn daily
The greatest aim in life is to serve.

See also 

 Yang Huimin
 Scouts of China

References 

World Association of Girl Guides and Girl Scouts member organizations
Scouting in Taiwan
Youth organizations established in 1958